Alexander Shepherd ( 1797/98 – 20 July 1859) was the second Colonial Treasurer of New Zealand.

Biography
Shepherd was born in Aberdeen. He arrived in Wellington on the New York Packet from London in 1842, where he was delayed by a month before the next vessel went to Auckland, then the seat of the Government.

Shepherd was appointed Colonial Treasurer on 9 May 1842, succeeding George Cooper. He thus became a member of the Executive Council of the Crown Colony, with the role of Colonial Treasurer being the fourth most senior role at the time (after Governor, Colonial Secretary and Attorney-General). When New Zealand gained self-government with the formation of the Fitzgerald Ministry on 14 June 1854, Shepherd's role was disestablished and he was given a government pension.

Shepherd's stepdaughter, Jane Augusta Griffith, married Frederick Whitaker at St. Paul's Church in Auckland on 4 March 1843. His second daughter, Cecilia Mary, married Maurice O'Rorke on 31 December 1858.

Shepherd died on 20 July 1859 aged 61 years in Auckland after a short illness.

Notes

References

1790s births
1859 deaths
People from Aberdeen
New Zealand public servants
People from Auckland
Members of the New Zealand Legislative Council (1841–1853)